Adrian is a surname derived from the Latin personal name . Notable people with the surname include:

 Barbara Adrian (1931–2014), American artist
 Chris Adrian (born 1970), American author
 Edgar Adrian, 1st Baron Adrian (1889–1977), British electrophysiologist and recipient of the 1932 Nobel Prize for Physiology
 Iris Adrian (1912–1994), American actress
 Max Adrian (1903–1973), Northern Irish stage, film and television actor and singer
 Nathan Adrian (born 1988), American swimmer and Olympic gold medalist
 Phil Adrian, Canadian football player
 Rhys Adrian (1928–1990), British playwright and screenwriter
 Richard Adrian, 2nd Baron Adrian (1927–1995), British physiologist, only son of Edgar Adrian
 Adrián (footballer) (born 1987), Spanish footballer who plays as a goalkeeper for English side Liverpool

References